William Mitcheson Timlin (11 April 1892 – 7 June 1943) was an architect and illustrator.

Early life
He was born in Ashington, Northumberland, the son of a colliery fireman.  He showed talent for drawing at Morpeth Grammar School, and received a scholarship to the Armstrong College of Art in Newcastle. In 1912, he joined his parents in Kimberley, South Africa where he  completed his training in art and architecture and remained for the rest of his life.

Architecture
Timlin designed a number of important buildings in Kimberley including Kimberley Boys' High School while pursuing his interest in art, turning out a large number of watercolour fantasies in addition to oils, pastels, etchings and periodical illustrations. His work was regularly exhibited. He also wrote stories and composed music.

Writing and Art
Timlin worked on The Ship that Sailed to Mars for two years. The work expanded until in its final form it had 48 pages of text and 48 colour plates showing remarkable flights of fantasy. 

Timlin sent the book to publishers George Harrap, who were delighted with the illustrations and the calligraphic text, deciding to print it without typesetting. The book has since become a fantasy classic. Alan Horne in The Dictionary of 20th Century British Book Illustrators describes the book as a masterpiece and "the most original and beautiful children's book of the 1920s".

The story revolves an Old Man and fairy companions who build a fantastical sailing ship to journey to Mars. Along the way, they encounter strange worlds, dangerous obstacles, and fantastical creatures. 

The film rights to the book were purchased in the United States, where Timlin enjoyed great popularity. The book also serves as inspiration for the characters in 398.2, a modern fairytale about a librarian and patron. 

Timlin illustrated many South African travel books and prepared illustrations for a book titled The Building of a Fairy City which was never published.

Death 
Timlin died in Kimberley, Northern Cape in 1943.

References

External links

Illustration from The Building of the Fairy City
 

1892 births
1943 deaths
Fantasy artists
20th-century illustrators of fairy tales
South African writers
South African children's writers
South African children's book illustrators
Writers who illustrated their own writing
People from Ashington
People educated at Morpeth School
Recipients of the Order of St. Sava
20th-century South African architects
20th-century South African writers